Acleris bowmanana is a species of moth of the family Tortricidae. It is found in North America, where it has been recorded from Alberta, British Columbia, California, Maine, Manitoba, Maryland, Michigan, New Brunswick, Ontario, Quebec, West Virginia and Wisconsin.

The wingspan is about 22 mm for males and 18–20 mm for females. The forewings are uniform deep purple-grey with a slight admixture of burnt-sienna scaling and a small ruddy shade at the base of the wing. The hindwings are semihyaline whitish, but slightly smoky apically. Adults have been recorded on wing from January to November.

The larvae feed on Myrica gale, Picea engelmannii, Picea glauca, Aronia melanocarpa, Spiraea and Rubus species.

References

Moths described in 1934
bowmanana
Moths of North America